The Kalyani Dam is a gravity dam constructed across the Swarnamukhi river at Tirupati city and located in Tirupati District of Andhra Pradesh, India. This dam is one of the major sources of water supply for Tirupati city and its catchment areas. Once filled, the dam can cater to the water needs of Tirupati for at least two years.

History
The dam was constructed in the year 1977.

Location
The dam was constructed across Swarnamukhi River  with 25 million cubic meters storage capacity between hills which are part of Seshachalam Hill ranges.

Data

 Catchment area: 
 Location of dam: Tirupati, Tirupati District, Andhra Pradesh
 Full Reservoir Level:  msl

See also
Swarnamukhi
Tirupati

References

Dams in Andhra Pradesh
Tirupati district
Tirupati
Buildings and structures in Tirupati
Dams completed in 1977
1977 establishments in Andhra Pradesh
Gravity dams
20th-century architecture in India